Four Ways is an album by American jazz saxophonist Roscoe Mitchell, with Stephen Rush's band Yuganaut which was recorded in 2009 at the University of Michigan in Ann Arbor and released on Nessa in 2017.

Reception
The dusted review by Derek Taylor says "Yuganaut’s methods and aesthetics draw immediate antecedents in Mitchell’s iconic Art Ensemble of Chicago, most obviously in the trio’s incorporation of a broad of assortment of instruments into its arsenal. With Mitchell added, Rush estimates their number at approaching fifty, although only a fraction of that number are pressed into service on the disc ... Rush notes his ardent willingness for further collaborations. Here's one listener who's hoping Mitchell takes him up on the offer."

Track listing
All compositions by Roscoe Mitchell except where indicated
 "Double Helix" (Tom Abbs) – 4:54
 "Improvisation No. 1" – 5:58
 "Improvisation No. 2" – 3:13
 "Improvisation No. 3" – 4:14
 "Cards for Yuganaut No. 1" – 7:33
 "Cards for Yuganaut No. 2" – 9:49
 "Cards for Yuganaut No. 3" – 8:06
 "Four Ways for Yuganaut and Roscoe Mitchell" (Stephen Rush) – 10:58
 "Son Warship" (Geoff Mann) – 7:53

Personnel
Roscoe Mitchell - flute, soprano saxophone, alto saxophone
Stephen Rush – Micromoog, Fender Rhodes, trombone, euphonium, ocarina, slide whistle, melodica, recorder, balloon
Tom Abbs –– bass, cello, violin, tuba, didgeridoo 
Geoff Mann – drums, cornet, banjo

References

2017 albums
Roscoe Mitchell albums
Nessa Records albums